Germán Alejo Pezzella (born 27 June 1991) is an Argentine professional footballer who plays as a centre-back for La Liga club Real Betis and the Argentina national team, with whom he won the 2022 FIFA World Cup.

Club career

Early career
Pezzella joined Club Atlético River Plate's youth setup in 2005, aged 14, after representing Club Olimpo. 

After impressing with the former's reserves he was called up to the pre-season in Canada, appearing in friendlies against Toronto FC, Montreal Impact and Everton.

River Plate
After being an unused substitute in a 0–0 away draw against Club Atlético Huracán on 18 October 2009, Pezzella made his senior debut on 7 December 2011, starting in a 1–0 home win against Defensores de Belgrano for the season's Copa Argentina. His league debut came on 2 March of the following year, where he played the full 90 minutes in a 0–0 home draw against Quilmes Atlético Club.

Pezzella scored his first professional goal on 2 September 2012, netting the last in a 1–1 draw at Club Atlético Colón. He also scored the equalizer in a 1–1 Superclásico home draw against Boca Juniors, just three minutes after coming off the bench.

On 10 December 2014, Pezzella scored the last in a 2014 Copa Sudamericana final 2–0 win against Atlético Nacional, as his side won its first international title after a 17-year absence.

Betis
On 10 July 2015, Pezzella signed a five-year contract with Real Betis, newly promoted to La Liga. He made his debut for the club on 23 August, starting in a 1–1 home draw against Villarreal CF.

Fiorentina
After a loan spell with Serie A club Fiorentina during the 2017–18 season, Pezzella signed a five-year contract with the club that runs through the end of the 2021–22 season for an €11m transfer fee. Ahead of the 2018–19 season, he was named the club's new captain.

Betis return
On 19 August 2021, Pezzella returned to Betis after signing a four-year deal.

International career
Pezzella played represented Argentina in 2009 Toulon Tournament. He also appeared with the side in 2011 South American U-20 Championship and 2011 FIFA U-20 World Cup, always as a starter.

On 1 September 2011, Pezzella was called up to the year's Pan American Games, appearing in five matches and scoring two goals during the competition.

In October 2017, he was called up to Argentina national team's squad for the first time for the 2018 World Cup qualifiers against Peru on 5 October and Ecuador on 10 October 2017. In May 2018 he was named in the Argentina national team's preliminary 35-man for the 2018 FIFA World Cup in Russia but did not make the final 23. On 27 March 2019, he captained Argentina in a 1–0 friendly away win against Morocco. He was included in Argentina's 26-man squad for the 2022 FIFA World Cup and came on as a substitute in extra-time of the final as his nation won a third world title by defeating France on penalties.

Career statistics

Club

International

Scores and results list Argentina's goal tally first, score column indicates score after each Pezzella goal.

Honours
River Plate
Argentina Primera Division: 2013–14
Copa Campeonato: 2013–14
Primera B Nacional: 2011–12
Copa Libertadores: 2015
Copa Sudamericana: 2014
Recopa Sudamericana: 2015

Real Betis
Copa del Rey: 2021–22

Argentina
FIFA World Cup: 2022
Copa América: 2021
CONMEBOL–UEFA Cup of Champions: 2022

References

External links

Profile at the Real Betis website

1991 births
Living people
Sportspeople from Bahía Blanca
Argentine people of Italian descent
Argentine footballers
Association football central defenders
Argentine Primera División players
Primera Nacional players
Club Atlético River Plate footballers
La Liga players
Real Betis players
Serie A players
ACF Fiorentina players
Argentina youth international footballers
Argentina under-20 international footballers
Footballers at the 2011 Pan American Games
Argentine expatriate footballers
Argentine expatriate sportspeople in Spain
Expatriate footballers in Spain
Pan American Games silver medalists for Argentina
Pan American Games medalists in football
2019 Copa América players
2021 Copa América players
2022 FIFA World Cup players
Argentina international footballers
Medalists at the 2011 Pan American Games
Copa América-winning players
Copa Libertadores-winning players
FIFA World Cup-winning players